Jackass Pass is a pedestrian mountain pass located in the Teton Range and on the border of Grand Teton National Park and Bridger-Teton National Forest in the U.S. state of Wyoming. Access to Jackass Pass from Grand Teton National Park involves a  hike up the Berry Creek Trail or even greater distances if coming from the National Forest side.

References

Mountain passes of Wyoming
Mountain passes of Teton County, Wyoming